Norman Cocker (1889 – 1953) was a British organist and composer for organ.

Cocker was born in Yorkshire, England, and became a chorister at Magdalen College, Oxford. He was awarded the Organ Scholarship at Merton College, Oxford, but never completed his degree after being sent down, on his own admission, for not doing enough work. He was appointed Assistant Organist at Manchester Cathedral in 1920, becoming Organist there in 1943, and later held appointments in various churches and cinemas in the city.

Cocker was also an amateur magician.

Norman Cocker is today remembered mainly for his 'Tuba Tune' (1922).

Norman Cocker held the diploma of ARCO, which he obtained by examination in July 1911 winning the Lafontaine Prize for the highest marks that session in the playing tests.

References
 Norman Cocker - Manchester Cathedral
 Norman Cocker- Bio, Albums, Pictures – Naxos Classical Music.

External links
 Norman Cocker at the IMSLP

1889 births
1953 deaths
Musicians from Yorkshire
British classical organists
British male organists
Cathedral organists
British classical composers
20th-century organists
20th-century British male musicians
Male classical organists